This is a list of notable events in music that took place in the 1490s.

Events 

1490
 January – Emperor Maximilian I writes a letter of recommendation for Jacobus Barbireau's visit to the Hungarian Court at Buda.
24 October – Johannes Tinctoris petitions Pope Innocent VIII for the title and privileges of doctor of canon and civil law.
1491 – After an extended legal disputation, the singer and composer Francisco de la Torre receives a half-prebendary at the Seville Cathedral.
1498 – The Wiener Hofmusikkapelle, a forerunner of the Vienna Boys' Choir, is founded by Maximilian I, Holy Roman Emperor.

Works 
1497 – Josquin des Prez – Nymphes des bois

Births 
 1490
 6 March – Fridolin Sicher, Swiss composer and organist (died 1546)
 12 October – Bernardo Pisano, Italian composer, singer, and classical scholar (died 1548)
 1496 – Johann Walter, German composer (died 1570)
 1499 – Bernardino de Sahagún, Spanish composer (died 1571)

Deaths
November 6, 1492 – Antoine Busnois,  composer and poet of the Burgundian School
January 28, 1495 – Juan de Triana, Spanish singer and composer
February 6, 1497 – Johannes Ockeghem, composer of the Franco-Flemish School

References

15th century in music
Music